Del entorno is the second studio album by heavy metal band Almafuerte, released in 1996 by DBN.

Tracks
All lyrics by Ricardo Iorio.
 Del entorno - [From the Environment]
 Lucero del alba - [Morning Star]
 Hacia el abismo - [To the Abyss]
 Por nacer - [To Be Born] 
 Amistades de tierra adentro - [Friends From Inland]
 Los delirios del defacto - [Delusions of the "De Facto"]
 1999
 De la carne - [About the Meat]
 Hombre peste - [Pest Man]
 Rubén Patagonia
 Presa fácil - [Easy Prey]

Personnel
Ricardo Iorio - vocals, bass
Claudio Marciello - guitars
Claudio Cardacci - drums
Flavio Cianciarulo - producer

References

1996 albums
Almafuerte (band) albums
Spanish-language albums